The 2017–18 Indian Women's League final round was played between seven teams to decide the champion of Indian Women's League second season. It was held from 26 March to 14 April at the JLN stadium in Shillong. The league proper followed a round-robin format with the top four teams advancing to the semifinals.

Eastern Sporting Union and Rising Student Club entered round by topping their groups in the preliminary round. Due to unavailability of teams from I-League and Indian Super League clubs, four more teams from the preliminary round Sethu FC, Indira Gandhi AS&E, Rush Soccer and KRYPHSA are promoted to final round. Gokulam Kerala FC women's team joined them to make it seven teams in the final round.

Teams

Group stage

Matches

Knock out stage

Bracket

Semi-finals

Final

Statistics

Top scorers

Hat-tricks 
Result column shows goal tally of player's team first.

References

External links
 Fixtures and results

Indian Women's League
2017–18 in Indian football leagues
2017–18 domestic women's association football leagues